Kouamatien Emmanuel Koné (born 31 December 1986) is an Ivorian professional footballer who plays as a midfielder for Greek Super League 2 club Levadiakos.

Club career
Koné was born in Abongoua.

In the January transfer window of the 2007–08 season, Koné left Ivorian club ASEC Mimosas to join Romanian Liga I CFR Cluj. On November 2011, he was released by CFR and after three weeks of tests with Sedan, he signed a contract for two and a half years with the French club. 

On 10 August 2013, Levadiakos announced the acquisition of Koné on a two-year contract for an undisclosed fee.

On 19 February 2015, the Ivorian attacking midfielder accused his club Levadiakos that they do not permit him to take part in training as long as he is not open for a contract extension which runs out at the end of the season. According to reports, Koné stayed in a hotel, but his club does not cover the expenses, while his family had been forced to return to France. On the other hand, the club denied Koné's claims, insisting that the Ivorian left Levadiakos without any warning and he was the one who expressed the desire to leave the club as he was considering an offer from a Qatari team. Levadiakos also claimed that Koné later came back as his potential move collapsed.

On 1 July 2015, Koné made an oral agreement with Veria, but eventually he signed a contract with Apollon Smyrnis for an undisclosed fee.

On 25 January 2019, Levadiakos officially announced the return of the Ivorian midfielder on a free transfer.

International career
Koné played for the Ivory Coast at the 2008 Summer Olympics in Beijing. He was also part of the squad for the 2010 FIFA World Cup.

Career statistics

International

Honours

ASEC Mimosas
 Côte d'Ivoire Premier Division: 2004, 2005, 2006
 Côte d'Ivoire Cup: 2005, 2007

CFR Cluj
 Romanian First League: 2011–12
 Romanian Cup: 2008–09

Apollon Smyrnis
 Football League: 2016–17

Levadiakos
 Super League 2: 2021–22

References

External links

1986 births
Living people
People from Lagunes District
Ivorian footballers
Association football midfielders
Ivory Coast international footballers
ASEC Mimosas players
CFR Cluj players
FC Internațional Curtea de Argeș players
CS Sedan Ardennes players
Veria F.C. players
Apollon Smyrnis F.C. players
Levadiakos F.C. players
Ligue 2 players
Expatriate footballers in Romania
Ivorian expatriate sportspeople in Romania
Expatriate footballers in France
Expatriate footballers in Greece
Ivorian expatriates in France
Footballers at the 2008 Summer Olympics
Olympic footballers of Ivory Coast
2010 Africa Cup of Nations players
2010 FIFA World Cup players